Brenda Kirk (11 January 1951 – 6 September 2015) was a South African tennis player.

Career
Her best singles result at a Grand Slam tournament was reaching the third round at the 1971 Wimbledon Championships.

In January 1971 she won the singles title of the Natal Sugar Championships. She won two doubles titles during her career; in July 1971 she won the Swiss Open partnering Laura Rossouw and in July 1972 she won the Irish Open with Pat Walkden.

She played for the South African Fed Cup team in 15 ties between 1969 and 1973 comprising a record of 17 wins and 10 losses. She was part of the South African team that won the Federation Cup in 1972 after a victory in the final over Great Britain at Ellis Park in Johannesburg, South Africa.

Personal life
Kirk married Jimmy Dimitriou in 1975 and the couple had two children. They divorced and she later married Iain Bryson with whom she had one child. Kirk died in her sleep on 6 September 2015.

Career finals

Doubles: 10 (2 titles, 8 runner-ups)

References

External links
 
 
 

1951 births
2015 deaths
South African female tennis players
White South African people